= Stonewash Ltd. =

Former digital magazine distribution company

Stonewash Ltd. was a digital magazine distribution company with offices in London and New York. The company built iOS, Android and Windows 8 apps for magazine and newspaper publishers, as well as catalogs.

== Company ==
The company was founded in 2009 by Daniel Sharp and Robert Grainger as a spin-off from DD&AG Ltd, a specialist London-based digital agency. Their product allows publishers to take existing PDFs and convert these to digital editions within native apps, and Stonewash were one of the first businesses within this field.

Initially the product was made available for iPhone, but was expanded to iPad in May 2010. In January 2012 Stonewash were invited by Microsoft to build the first magazine app framework for Windows 8 and were the first developers to release magazines to the consumer preview version of Windows 8 in April 2012.

Stonewash was acquired by Paperlit in early 2016.

== Readership data ==
Stonewash is best known for its pioneering work around tracking behavioural data for magazine readers and have made elements of this data widely available to the publishing industry. The company was the first in its field to build an in-house analytics package offering detailed data on trends and reading habits on tablets and smartphones.

== Publications ==
Publications powered by Stonewash software included Aston Martin, PC Pro, Boat International, Lusso, Fine Cooking, Battersea Dogs & Cats Home, Burgess Yachts, The Art Newspaper, Health & Fitness, Farmers Guardian, Pulse Today, Fine Woodworking, Threads, Travel Retail Business, The Elevator, The Irish Garden and Air-Britain, among others.
